Within the politics of Germany, the Second Kohl cabinet led by Helmut Kohl, was sworn in on  March 29, 1983 and laid down its function on  March 11, 1987. The cabinet was formed after the 1983 elections. It was succeeded by the Cabinet Kohl III, which was formed following the 1987 elections. Starting in June 1986 it was the first West German federal cabinet to have a Minister of the Environment.

Composition

|}

References

Kohl
1983 establishments in West Germany
1987 disestablishments in West Germany
Cabinets established in 1983
Cabinets disestablished in 1987
Helmut Kohl
Kohl II